Jean Harrower is a female former international table tennis player from England.

Table tennis career
She represented England at the 1961 World Table Tennis Championships in the Corbillon Cup (women's team event) with Diane Rowe.

She represented Middlesex at county level.

Personal life
Her father was the England international and Table Tennis England magazine editor Geoff Harrower.

See also
 List of England players at the World Team Table Tennis Championships

References

English female table tennis players
1943 births
Living people